Combined Scottish Districts is a select Scottish provincial amateur rugby union team that draws its players from Glasgow District, Edinburgh District, North of Scotland District, Midlands District, South of Scotland District and Scottish Exiles District. It is occasionally known as the Scottish Districts side.

Like all District sides in Scotland, this was open to any nationality of players that played in Scotland. However in practice it was used to showcase Scottish talent, and the side was formed primarily to play against international opposition.

History

Formation

The first match can be taken as the 'Scottish side' which played the Anglo-Scots on 23 December 1911, as a trial match.

The first international match of the Combined Scottish Districts side can be taken as in 27 November 1912 to play against South Africa at New Anniesland in Glasgow.

It was officially billed as a 'Glasgow and Districts' side but a cursory look at the side reveals players from South of Scotland District, Midlands District, Edinburgh District as well as Glasgow District in the team fielded.

Only the Glasgow Herald reported the resulting team as a 'Glasgow and Districts' side.

The Scotsman reported the team more accurately as a 'Scottish' side. It noted:
SCOTTISH FIFTEEN v SOUTH AFRICANS. EASY VICTORY FOR THE COLONIALS
What was officially designated a Glasgow and Districts fifteen, was really a Scottish one, containing as it did men from all parts of the country, north, south, east, and west, proved no match yesterday for the South Africans who then played their second and concluding engagement in Scotland.

The majority of the players came from outwith Glasgow District:

From South of Scotland District: Borth Todd (Gala), J. Brown (Melrose), J. Moffat (Langholm), M. Jardine (Gala)
From Midlands District: J. R. Philip (Panmure), J. Law (Panmure)
From Edinburgh District: Sandy Gunn (Royal HSFP), John Hume (Royal HSFP)

Matches against other districts

Occasionally the Combined Scottish Districts side would play against other District sides in Scotland.

Last match

The last match the side played was against Australia in 1996. This match was organised before the Scottish districts turned professional. Roy Laidlaw was the Head Coach of the side at the time.

Partial list of games played against international opposition

Notable former players

Scotland Internationalists

References

Scottish District sides